Carina Witthöft is the defending champion, but decided not to participate this year.

Olga Fridman won the title, defeating Kristýna Plíšková in the final, 6–2, 3–6, 6–1.

Seeds

Draw

Finals

Top half

Bottom half

References
Main Draw

Open Engie de Touraine - Singles